Foldereid Church is a parish church of the Church of Norway in Nærøysund municipality in Trøndelag county, Norway. It is located in the village of Foldereid. It is one of the churches for the Nærøy parish which is part of the Namdal prosti (deanery) in the Diocese of Nidaros. The white, wooden church was built in a long church style in 1863 using plans drawn up by the architect Christian Heinrich Grosch. The church seats about 280 people.

History
The earliest existing historical records of the church date back to the year 1589, but it was not new that year. Originally, the church was an annex church for the main Nærøy Church and the priest would visit Foldereid approximately once a month. In 1675, the old church was torn down and replaced with a new church on the same site. After the new church was consecrated in 1864, the old church was torn down.

See also
List of churches in Nidaros

References

Nærøysund
Churches in Trøndelag
Long churches in Norway
Wooden churches in Norway
19th-century Church of Norway church buildings
Churches completed in 1863
14th-century establishments in Norway